Thomas Atcitty (November 1, 1933 – October 11, 2020) was an American politician and educator who served in the New Mexico House of Representatives as a member of the Democratic Party, 2nd Vice President of the Navajo Nation, and briefly served as the 3rd President of the Navajo Nation. He was a member of the Navajo Nation.

Early life
Thomas Atcitty was born on November 1, 1933 in Shiprock. Atcitty graduated from Navajo Mission High School in 1954, and attended Taylor University, the University of Colorado, and Gannon University. He served in the United States Marine Corps.

Career

Education

Atcitty served as the vice-president of the Navajo Community College during the 1970s after starting to work at the college in 1969. On October 16, 1972, President Ned Hatathli died when he shot himself while cleaning his rifle causing Atcitty to become acting president. Atcitty was selected to replace Hatathli on December 4, and later became the official third president of the college on February 8, 1973. He served as president of the college until his resignation made effective March 1, 1977.

Politics

Atcitty was elected to the New Mexico House of Representatives from the 4th district as a member of the Democratic Party and served until his resignation in January 1995. During his tenure in the New Mexico House of Representatives he served as the chairman of the Consumer and Public Affairs committee. Atcitty also served as the co-chairman of the Democratic caucus in the House of Representatives alongside Felix Nunez.

Atcitty served as Albert Hale's vice-presidential running mate during the 1994 Navajo Nation presidential election and they won defeating incumbent President Peterson Zah. He resigned from the House of Representatives to become the Vice President of the Navajo Nation. During his vice-presidency he sought the pardon of Peter MacDonald by President Bill Clinton. On February 18, 1998, President Hale resigned to avoid criminal prosecution causing Atcitty to become President of the Navajo Nation, but he only served until he was removed by the Navajo Nation Council on July 23, 1998, for violating ethic codes. During his tenure as president he was given the Medgar Evers Award by the NAACP.

Death

Atcitty died from natural causes on October 11, 2020, at age 86.

References

1933 births
2020 deaths
20th-century Native Americans
Gannon University alumni
Democratic Party members of the New Mexico House of Representatives
Military personnel from New Mexico
People from Shiprock, New Mexico
Presidents of the Navajo Nation
Taylor University alumni
University of Colorado alumni
Vice Presidents of the Navajo Nation
21st-century Native Americans